Sarah Bro (born 4 March 1996) is a Danish swimmer. She competed in the women's 4 × 100 metre freestyle relay event at the 2016 Summer Olympics.

References

External links
 

1996 births
Living people
Danish female freestyle swimmers
Olympic swimmers of Denmark
Swimmers at the 2016 Summer Olympics
Swimmers from Copenhagen